Santiago Ramírez (born August 15, 1978) is a former professional baseball pitcher. He played part of one season in Major League Baseball for the Washington Nationals, appearing in four games. He also played in Nippon Professional Baseball for the Chunichi Dragons in 2007, appearing in 27 games.

Career
Ramírez was signed as anamateur free agent by the Houston Astros in 1997. After spending the next two seasons playing baseball in the Dominican Republic, Ramírez made his minor league debut in 1999 with the Martinsville Astros, Houston's rookie-level minor league affiliate. He made 25 appearances as a relief pitcher for Martinsville, winning two games and losing one with a 1.45 earned run average (ERA) and 17 saves.

He became a free agent after the 2004 season, and spent one season in the Kansas City Royals organization before signing with the Nationals.

Ramírez was released by Washington on July 1, 2006 and joined the Chunichi Dragons in 2007. After spending the 2008 season in the Mexican League with the Sultanes de Monterrey, he played for the Worcester Tornadoes of the independent Can-Am League in 2009, his last professional season.

References

External links

1978 births
Living people
Águilas Cibaeñas players
Auburn Doubledays players
Central American and Caribbean Games gold medalists for the Dominican Republic
Chunichi Dragons players
Dominican Republic expatriate baseball players in Japan
Dominican Republic expatriate baseball players in Mexico
Dominican Republic expatriate baseball players in the United States

Lexington Legends players
Major League Baseball pitchers
Major League Baseball players from the Dominican Republic
Martinsville Astros players
Mexican League baseball pitchers
Michigan Battle Cats players
New Orleans Zephyrs players
Nippon Professional Baseball pitchers
Omaha Royals players
People from Bonao
Round Rock Express players
Sultanes de Monterrey players
Washington Nationals players
Worcester Tornadoes players
Competitors at the 2010 Central American and Caribbean Games
Central American and Caribbean Games medalists in baseball